Garden Making is an independent Canadian quarterly magazine for home gardeners published by Inspiring Media Inc., in Niagara-on-the-Lake, Ontario.

History
The magazine was launched in 2010 by Beckie and Michael Fox, two longtime magazine professionals. Beckie, Garden Making'''s editor-in-chief, was on the editorial team of Canadian Gardening magazine for its first decade, from the launch in 1990 until becoming its editor, from 1999 to 2001, when it was owned by Avid Media. Michael, CEO and publisher of Garden Making, retired from Rogers Publishing in 2012, where he had worked in senior management for more than 30 years. He is the 2015 recipient of Outstanding Achievement from the National Magazine Awards Foundation.

In 2016 Toronto Star columnist Sonia Day wrote that Garden Making "offers real, practical information about growing things (instead of lifestyle piffle) with lovely pictures and an easy-to-read layout." In  2012 Garden Making'' was included as a recent example in an exhibition of British and Canadian gardening literature throughout the centuries at the Thomas Fisher Rare Book Library, University of Toronto.

Awards
Gold Award for Best Overall Magazine, Fall 2016, Gold Award for Best Overall Magazine, Fall 2013, Association for Garden Communicators (GWA) Awards.

References

External links
 
 Garden Beds

Hobby magazines published in Canada
Lifestyle magazines published in Canada
Quarterly magazines published in Canada
Gardening in Canada
Gardening magazines
Magazines established in 2010
Magazines published in Ontario